Phoenix High School is a K-12 school in Braithwaite, a community in unincorporated Plaquemines Parish, Louisiana. It serves Braithwaite, Bohemia, and Phoenix, and is a part of the Plaquemines Parish School Board.

History
In 2009–2010 the school had 193 students, and this increased to 209 by 2010–2011.

The school's current campus opened in 2012.

Athletics
Phoenix High athletics competes in the LHSAA.

References

External links
 Phoenix High School
 
  (2003-2005)

Schools in Plaquemines Parish, Louisiana
Public K-12 schools in Louisiana